Mohan G. Kshatriyan is an Indian film director and producer, who has directed Tamil language films. He became known for the thriller drama Pazhaya Vannarapettai (2016), and has gone on to make feature films including the dramas Draupathi (2020), Rudra Thandavam(2021) and Bakasuran (2023)

Career
Mohan began his directorial career with Pazhaya Vannarapettai (2016), before making Draupathi (2020). The film had to be crowdfunded as no producer was willing to produce the film, fearing it would incite controversy. Opening to mixed reviews, the film was criticized for its alleged pro-casteism stand and intent to uphold casteism. The film eventually earned 23 times its budget at the box office,and prompted further attention for Mohan as a filmmaker.

He subsequently collaborated with Richard again on Rudra Thandavam (2021). Reviewing the film, S. Srivatsan from The Hindu wrote "Unlike Draupadi, in which Mohan G seems to have played it safe by testing waters with his "ideology", he seems to have finally come out with this movie by making a passionate plea to "erase" caste from caste-related violence, in a shocking manner. Mohan G attacks his critics directly for calling him out for making a casteist work in Draupathi. He introduces a dangerous concept called crypto-Christians, primarily attacking Dalit Christians, who, according to the director, are benefiting from the fruits of caste, despite having being converted. There is a whole history behind why Dalits took refuge in Christianity, but that is not something this movie seems interested in. Everything is all over the place, from music to acting."

In 2023, Mohan worked on Bakasuran, which starred Selvaraghavan and Natty in the lead roles. Following the film's release, Mohan noted that he had been approached by Telugu film producer Bellamkonda Suresh to direct the Telugu version of the film.

Mohan's next film will star Richard, marking the third collaboration between the actor and the director.

Filmography
Films

References

External links

Living people
Tamil film directors
Film directors from Tamil Nadu
Year of birth missing (living people)
21st-century Indian film directors
Tamil screenwriters